Lessertia barbara is a spider species found in caves in Spain, Morocco, and Algeria.

See also 
 List of Linyphiidae species (I–P)

References

External links 

Linyphiidae
Spiders of Europe
Spiders of Africa
Fauna of Algeria
Fauna of Morocco
Spiders described in 1884
Cave spiders